Lyddell "Lyd" Sawyer (1856-1927) was a British photographer and founding member of The Linked Ring group of photographers. Although he showed almost 100 prints at what was later to become the Royal Photographic Society, only a handful of his images are well known.

Sawyer was born in North Shields on the River Tyne, and later moved to London. His early life in Tyneside had a lasting effect on his work, his Geordie roots shaping many of his photographs. Works like The Apple Stealers Dividing the Spoils, Nutting Time, and Come Along Grandad give evidence that his life was not one of affluence like so many of his southern contemporary photographers. 

Sawyer's figure studies are not straight documentation most are influenced by his love of the theatre, staging his images into tableaux with great sensitivity. His early work in the North uses locations influenced by poverty, but does not romanticise poverty. For example, the children in his images are dressed in their 'Sunday Best' yet his images still capture the realism of the scene.

Of the English members of the 'Linked Ring' Sawyer is probably the least well known. The main reason for this is very few of his photographs have survived, there are the four that were illustrated in 'Sun Artists' in 1893 that was dedicated to him, along with such important figures in the history of photography as Julia Margaret Cameron and H.P. Robinson. Sawyer was also a successful business forming a limited company with several branches including Regent Street, London as well as Sunderland and Newcastle upon Tyne in his native north east. In 1901 Lyddell Sawyer left The Linked Ring and continued operating a studio in Madia Vale until at least 1908.

References 

The Linked Ring by Margaret Harker
Masterpieces of Victorian Photography by Helmut Gernsheim

Photographers from Northumberland
1856 births
1927 deaths
People from North Shields